This is a list of adult fiction books that topped The New York Times Fiction Best Seller list in 1943.

Only three titles topped the list in 1943. The most popular was The Robe, by Lloyd Douglas, which started the year at the top of the list and only dropped to number two for one week in March to Mrs. Parkington, by Louis Bromfield, before finally ceding the top spot to So Little Time, by John P. Marquand, in mid-October.  Marquand's satirical novel stayed at the top of the list for the rest of the year.

After The Robe was toppled, it still remained near the top of the chart for two more years. Thus very early in the history of the NYT best seller list, The Robe set the record as the adult fiction title with the longest run on the list, and it continued to hold the record at least until 1992. The book returned to the bestseller list in 1953 when a film of the same name was released. By 1975, The Robe had sold more than 3.7 million copies.

See also

 1943 in literature
 Lists of The New York Times Fiction Best Sellers
 Publishers Weekly list of bestselling novels in the United States in the 1940s

References

1943
.
1943 in the United States